Dark current may refer to:

 Dark current (biochemistry), the depolarizing current, carried by Na+ ions that flows into a photoreceptor cell when unstimulated
 Dark current (physics):, the electric current that flows through a photosensitive device when no photons are entering the device
 Dark current (chemistry), the constant response produced by a spectrochemical receptor in the absence of radiation